Brandon Jacobson (born November 14, 2003) is an American chess player who received the FIDE title of Grandmaster in 2020 at the age of 16. He previously held the International Master (2018) and FIDE Master (2017) titles. Jacobson is the seventh U18 player in the United States and 54th U18 player in the world. He is ranked the 67th best player in the United States. His highest rating was 2551 (in October 2022). He was accepted to Columbia University at age 14. Brandon's older brother Aaron Jacobson holds the title of FIDE Master.

In January 2020, Jacobson won the 2020 Charlotte Open in Charlotte, North Carolina, with a score of 7.0/9, half a point ahead of GM Cemil Can Ali Marandi, GM Akshat Chandra, GM Andrew Tang, GM Ulvi Bajarani, and IM Aaron Grabinsky.  He earned his final GM norm and a $3000 prize. 

Later in 2020, Jacobson participated in the 2020 US Junior Chess Championship. He ended the tournament with a 5.5 score and 4th in rankings.

References

External links
 
 
 

2003 births
Living people
American chess players
Chess grandmasters
Sportspeople from Plainfield, New Jersey